Budaguru Ramakrishnaiah Panthulu (26 July 1910 – 8 October 1974) was an Indian film director, producer and actor. He is best known for directing films in Kannada, Tamil, Telugu and Hindi. His most popular films are Karnan, Veerapandiya Kattabomman, Sri Krishnadevaraya, School Master and  Kittur Channamma, B. R. Panthulu, is a successful actor and converted Ma. Po. Si.'s biographic works Veerapandiya Kattabomman (a movie about a local chieftain who fought with the British in the 18th century in Tamil Nadu) and Kappalottiya Thamizhan (a movie about a lawyer who rebelled against the British rule that forbade Tamils operating shipping companies) to celluloid.

Early life
Panthulu was born on 26 July 1910 in the village of Rallabudaguru of Arcot  district in the erstwhile Madras state  (in present-day Chittoor district of Andhra Pradesh ). He began his career as a teacher. Influenced by professional theatre during the time, he joined the troupe Chandrakala Nataka Mandali. He acted in plays Samsara Nouka, Sadarame and Guleba Kavali. He also worked for some time with Gubbi Veeranna's troupe and acted in Sri Krishna Garudi among others. Panthulu then formed his own Kannada professional theatre troupe, the Kalaseva Nataka Mandali, staging plays of his own choice.

Career
He made his debut as an actor in the 1936 Kannada film Samsara Nauka, an adaptation of the play he acted in. It was produced by Devi Films, based in Chennai. Directed by H. L. N. Simha, the film starred Panthulu, M. V. Rajamma, Dikki Madhava Rao, S. K. Padmadevi and M. S. Madhava Rao. The hero marries against his grandfather's wishes and is cast out. His troubles do not end there – he finds no favour with his in-laws, loses his job, and finds himself accused of murdering the bride his grandfather had chosen for him. The film was adapted from a play by the Chadrakala Natak Mandali, and remained true to the original's reformist ideal.

In 1950, he made the Tamil film Macharekhai, partnering with filmmaker P. Pullaiah under a stage company that later came to be known as Sukumar Productions with musician T. R. Mahalingam as his partner. With writer P. Neelakantan, he started the company Padmini Pictures, and produced the Tamil film Kalyanam Panniyum Brahmachari in 1954. Under the banner, he would go on to produce the Kannada films School Master (1958), Kittur Chennamma (1961) and Sri Krishnadevaraya (1970), that went on to become landmark films. His portrayal of Timmarusu, the Prime minister of the Vijayanagara King Krishnadevaraya, won him the Karnataka State Film Award for Best Actor.

As director, Panthulu his debut as a director with the Kannada film Rathnagiri Rahasya, a major commercial success during the time. He has produced and directed 57 films in all South Indian languages under the banner of Padmini Pictures.

Filmography

Awards

International Film Awards for his film "Veerapandia Kattapomman"

National Film Awards
 1958: All India Certificate of Merit for Third Best Feature film – School Master
 1959: Certificate of Merit for Best Feature Film in Tamil – Veerapandiya Kattabomman
 1961: Certificate of Merit for Best Feature Film in Kannada – Kittur Chennamma
 1961: President's silver medal for Best Feature Film in Tamil – Kappalottiya Thamizhan
Karnataka State Film Awards
 1969-70: Karnataka State Film Award for Best Actor - Sri Krishnadevaraya

Filmfare Awards South
 1970: Filmfare Award for Best Film – Kannada - Sri Krishnadevaraya

Book on B.R.Pantulu
A. N. Prahlada Rao has written a Book '"Danivillada Dhani" on B.R.Panthulu in Kannada, consisting of the details of his childhood, theatre, films produced in Kannada, Tamil, Telugu, Hindi and Malayalam. The book was published by Karnataka Chalanachitra Academy. The book was released in November 2016 by Dr. Bharati Vishnuvardhan. Journalist and short story writer Jogi spoke on Book. S.V. Rajendra Singh Baabu presided.

References

Kannada film producers
Telugu film directors
Kannada film directors
Male actors in Kannada cinema
Male actors in Tamil cinema
Tamil film directors
1910 births
1974 deaths
20th-century Indian film directors
People from Kolar
Film producers from Karnataka
Tamil film producers
Hindi film producers
Hindi-language film directors
20th-century Indian businesspeople
Film directors from Karnataka
Indian male film actors
Male actors in Hindi cinema
Male actors in Telugu cinema